Ismene refers to:

Mythology
 Ismene, the daughter and half-sister of Oedipus
 Ismene (Asopid), a character in Greek mythology

Other
 Ismene (plant), a genus of perennial bulbs
 Ismene (moth), a genus of moths of the family Crambidae
 190 Ismene, a main belt asteroid